Chochołów  is a village in the administrative district of Gmina Czarny Dunajec, within Nowy Targ County, Lesser Poland Voivodeship, in southern Poland, close to the border with Slovakia. 

The village has an approximate population of 1,135.

History
Chochołów was founded in the 16th century by Bartłomiej Chochołowski, who was appointed hereditary sołtys by Polish King Stephen Báthory for his war merits. The first church was built in the 16th century.

Following the late-18th-century Partitions of Poland, it was annexed by Austria. It became known as the place of the Chochołów Uprising of 1846 (Powstanie chochołowskie) against the foreign oppression in the Austrian Partition of Poland. The uprising was crushed by the Austrians, and its leaders were imprisoned in various locations. Following World War I, Poland regained independence and control of the village.

Its economy is closely associated with the popular Polish-Slovak border crossing.

Sights
Chochołów is a village comprised almost exclusively of the heritage Polish wooden houses built by the Polish Góral highlanders. Prominent heritage sights include the Chochołów Uprising Museum and the Saint Hyacinth church.

Gallery

References

Villages in Nowy Targ County
16th-century establishments in Poland
Populated places established in the 16th century